White Oak Mountain Wildlife Management Area is a  Wildlife Management Area (WMA) in Pittsylvania County, Virginia, United States. The property is nearly two-thirds forest, with timber types including pines and various examples of hardwoods, such as several species of oak. Forest management, annual and perennial plantings, and controlled burns are used to enhance wildlife habitat within the area.

White Oak Mountain WMA is owned and maintained by the Virginia Department of Game and Inland Fisheries. The area is open to the public for hunting, trapping, fishing, hiking, horseback riding, and primitive camping. A shooting range is available for sighting-in firearms. Access for persons 17 years of age or older requires a valid hunting or fishing permit, or a WMA access permit.

See also
Virginia Wildlife Management Areas

References

External links
Virginia Department of Game and Inland Fisheries: White Oak Mountain Wildlife Management Area

Wildlife management areas of Virginia
Protected areas of Pittsylvania County, Virginia